Eric Johnson (born October 11, 1962) is an American professional golfer.

Johnson was born in Seaside, Oregon. He won the 1980 U.S. Junior Amateur. He played college golf at the University of Oregon.

Johnson turned professional in 1983. He played on the Nationwide Tour in 1993, 1995–96, and 1998–2003. He won twice on tour: the 1996 Nike Knoxville Open and the 1998 Nike South Florida Open. He played one full season on the PGA Tour in  1997 where his best finish was T-12 at the GTE Byron Nelson Golf Classic.

Johnson is a golf instructor at the RiverRidge Golf Complex in Eugene, Oregon.

Amateur wins
1980 U.S. Junior Amateur
1982 Pacific Northwest Amateur

Professional wins (2)

Nike Tour wins (2)

Results in major championships

CUT = missed the halfway cut
Note: Johnson only played in the U.S. Open.

See also
1996 Nike Tour graduates

References

External links

American male golfers
Oregon Ducks men's golfers
PGA Tour golfers
Korn Ferry Tour graduates
Golfers from Oregon
People from Seaside, Oregon
1962 births
Living people